Briggsia hastingsi is a species of clingfish so far only known from Rahah Bay, Oman.  This species grows to a length of  SL.  This species is the only known member of its genus. It was described in 2009 from the only known specimen by Matthew T. Craig and John E. Randall. The generic name honours the clingfish systematicist John Carmon Briggs  (1920-2018) of the Georgia Museum of Natural History while the specific name honours Philip A. Hastings of the Scripps Institute of Oceanography, who was the PhD supervisor of Matthew T. Craig and who sparked his interest in clingfishes.

References

Gobiesocidae
Fish described in 2009